Progressive disseminated histoplasmosis is an infection caused by Histoplasma capsulatum, and most people who develop this severe form of histoplasmosis are immunocompromised or taking systemic corticosteroids.  Skin lesions are present in approximately 6% of patients with dissemination.

See also 
 Histoplasmosis

References 

Mycosis-related cutaneous conditions